The Tenbury and Bewdley Railway was an English railway company that built its line from Bewdley in Worcestershire to Tenbury station, which was in Shropshire. The line connected the Severn Valley Railway at Bewdley with the Tenbury Railway at Tenbury. The Tenbury Railway connected at Woofferton with the Shrewsbury and Hereford Railway main line. Two railways were sometimes referred to as the Wyre Forest line or simply the Tenbury Line.

The Tenbury and Bewdley Railway opened its line in 1864. It passed into the control of the Great Western Railway.

The line closed to passenger trains in 1962 and to goods traffic in 1965; there is now no railway activity on the former line.

Conception
The Shrewsbury and Hereford Railway opened its line throughout on 6 December 1852. Tenbury was a little over five miles from Woofferton station on that line, and a branch line was planned: it opened on 1 August 1861.

While the Tenbury line was under construction, there was already enthusiasm to extend the line to Bewdley. There were two immediate problems, gathering enough money to pay the Parliamentary deposit, and heading off the suspected hostility of the Shrewsbury and Hereford Railway. The former was resolved by getting a £9,600 bank loan.

The Bill for the proposed Tenbury and Bewdley Railway went to Parliament in the 1860 session; the S&HR did indeed oppose it, but their opposition was overcome, and the T&BR obtained the Royal Assent on 3 July 1860; capital was to be £120,000. The line would run from a junction with the Tenbury Railway at Tenbury to the Bewdley. There it would make a junction with the Severn Valley Railway, which was then under construction; it was a branch of the Great Western Railway. At this time the Shrewsbury and Hereford Railway amalgamated with others to form the West Midland Railway.

Construction and railway politics
A working arrangement with the West Midland Railway was concluded, by which the Tenbury and Bewdley Railway Company would receive 40% of gross receipts, after payment of interest on the borrowings. However the Company was unable to raise the money to pay its contractor for the construction, and there was a protracted delay. Eventually in October 1861 instructions were given to commence work. In September 1862 the Shareholders were informed that arrangements had been made to lease the line to the West Midland Railway, giving a dividend of 4% after the first three years.
The main line at Woofferton (the former Shrewsbury and Hereford Railway) had been leased jointly to the London and North Western Railway (50%) and the Great Western Railway and the West Midland Railway (together 50%). The Tenbury Railway was carried into the joint line status; the lease took effect on 1 July 1862.
Meanwhile the construction of the Tenbury and Bewdley had not been progressing well. However eventually preparations were in hand for opening. A serious landslip in Prizeley cutting took place on 24 June, and the planned opening had to be postponed. The earthwork was stabilised, and a ceremonial opening took place on 4 August 1864, although the line had not yet been approved for passenger operation.

Opening
Captain Tyler of the Board of Trade visited the line on 9 August 1864 and gave his consent to opening for passenger trains. The line opened fully on 13 August 1864.

The line was worked by the Great Western Railway, with which the West Midland Railway had amalgamated in 1863; this was charged at 60% of gross receipts.

Bewdley to Kidderminster line
The junction with the Severn Valley Railway at Bewdley connected southwards, towards Droitwich Spa, and now much energy was expended in creating a shorter route to Birmingham. This was referred to as the Bewdley Curve or Bewdley Loop, although it was a line of three miles in length between Bewdley and Kidderminster. That line was opened on 1 June 1878 and enabled trains from the Tenbury direction to run direct towards Kidderminster, for Birmingham.

Acquired by the GWR
The Tenbury and Bewdley Railway company was transferred to the ownership of the Great Western Railway from 1 February 1870.  A year earlier, from 1 January 1869, the lease of the Tenbury Railway was converted to outright ownership by the LNWR and GWR, under an agreement of 1 December 1868.

Cleobury Mortimer and Ditton Priors Light Railway

The Cleobury Mortimer and Ditton Priors Light Railway was authorised under a Light Railway Order on 23 March 1901. It was to build a line from a junction with the Tenbury and Bewdley Railway at Cleobury Mortimer. After considerable delay the line was opened to goods traffic on 19 July 1908, passenger trains following on 21 November 1908.

For some years the Cleobury Mortimer and Ditton Priors Railway was simply a rural branch line; its passenger service ceased in 1938. The increasing international tension following the Munich crisis of 1938 resulted, among other things, in a search for sites for the storage of naval ordnance. A site at Ditton Priors was considered to be suitable, and preparations were made to construct what became the Royal Naval Armaments Depot, Ditton Priors. It opened in 1940, and the majority of the traffic moved by rail. .

The site eventually extended over a very considerable area, and the development brought much goods traffic to the CM&DPR and also the Tenbury and Bewdley line. At the end of World War II the depot was used for decommissioned armaments. In 1955 the branch line was transferred to the ownership of the Ministry of Defence (Admiralty) for £40,000. In 1960 the railway line was finally closed but the Royal Navy continued to use the depot as a non-rail-connected base until 1965.

Train service
The passenger train service indicated in the Bradshaw's Guide varied little over the years. In 1895 there were four trains daily (not Sundays) between Bewdley and Woofferton, with an additional two on the Tenbury to Woofferton section. By 1910 this had changed to five and four respectively, remaining similar from 1922 to 1960.

Decline and closure

The rural nature of the Tenbury and Bewdley main line resulted in a steep decline in business as reliable road transport, both passenger and goods, developed. It became plain that the line was heavily loss-making. Closure was proposed in 1960, but a case was made concerning the hardship that closure of the line would cause, especially to schoolchildren who relied on the trains. The decision was taken to close the line from Tenbury Wells to Woofferton completely from 31 July 1961. One passenger train each way daily would run from Kidderminster via Bewdley to Tenbury Wells for a trial period of one year, at times suitable for the schools.

In fact the experimental service for schoolchildren started during the school holidays, and this inauspicious start was followed by minimal use of the trains. The decision was taken to discontinue them, closing the entire line to passenger use; the closure took place on 1 August 1962, a Wednesday.

After closure, a goods service was retained on the branch only as far as Tenbury from Bewdley. All connections with the Shrewsbury and Hereford main line had been removed at Woofferton on 12 November 1961. The goods service to Tenbury was withdrawn on 6 January 1964. The goods service to Cleobury Mortimer and Ditton Priors continued, but that business dwindled further, and on Good Friday 16 April 1965, from which date only the dismantling traffic continued. With lifting of the track completed, the spans of Dowles Bridge were dismantled in March 1966 leaving only the supports standing in the river.

Station list

 Tenbury; opened 1 August 1861; renamed Tenbury Wells 1912; closed 1 August 1962;
 Newnham; opened 13 August 1864; renamed Newnham Bridge 1873; closed 1 August 1962;
 Neen Sollars; opened 13 August 1864; closed 1 August 1962;
 Cleobury Mortimer; opened 13 August 1864; closed 1 August 1962;
 Wyre Forest; opened July 1869; closed 1 August 1962;
 Dowles Bridge;
 Bewdley; opened 1 February 1862; closed 5 January 1970; subsequently part of the heritage railway.

Notes

References

Bibliography

External links 
 Severn Valley Railway

Bridges across the River Severn
Rail transport in Shropshire
Closed railway lines in the West Midlands (region)